Fall River is a river in Fall River County, South Dakota. The river is the namesake of Fall River County.

Fall River was so named on account of its relatively steep stream gradient.

See also
List of rivers of South Dakota

References

Rivers of Fall River County, South Dakota
Rivers of South Dakota